Here Come the Cars is the debut solo album by New Zealand musician David Kilgour, released in 1991. It was reissued by Flying Nun Records in 2004 and in 2012.

The album peaked at #35 on the New Zealand album chart.

Production
Kilgour recorded the album at Writhe Studios with members of the Strangeloves as his backing band.

Critical reception
AllMusic wrote that "Kilgour's solo debut is a beauty, managing the neat trick -- like so many of Flying Nun's acts at their best -- of combining ready listenability with a dark but sweet edge." Trouser Press called the album "gorgeous" and "catchy, multi-textured and thoughtful all the way through."

Track listing

Personnel
David Kilgour (vocals, guitar, organ, piano, percussion)
Tane Tokona (drums)
Noel Ward (bass)

Charts

References

Albums by New Zealand artists
1991 albums